Roxana Boamfă (born August 5, 1987 in Braşov, Romania) is a Romanian former competitive figure skater. She is the 2004 & 2006 Romanian national silver medalist and competed for two seasons on the Junior Grand Prix circuit.

Competitive highlights

 QR = Qualifying Round

External links
 

Romanian female single skaters
1987 births
Living people